Jessica Sipos is a Canadian actor. She is best known for playing Sarah on Chesapeake Shores, Hayley on UnREAL and Cassandra Savage on The CW’s Legends of Tomorrow.

Life and career 
Sipos was born in Victoria, British Columbia. She is of ethnic Hungarian descent from Croatia. Her older brother is actor Shaun Sipos.

She has had guest roles on the television series Dark Matter, Wynonna Earp, and Legends of Tomorrow, as well as recurring roles in Ascension and Slasher. Her film roles have included Dead on Campus, Cold Deck, Signed, Sealed, Delivered: To the Altar and A Daughter's Revenge. She plays the lead role in the Canadian movie Goliath.

Filmography

References

External links 

Living people
21st-century Canadian actresses
Canadian film actresses
Canadian television actresses
Canadian people of Croatian descent
Actresses from Victoria, British Columbia
Year of birth missing (living people)
Canadian people of Hungarian descent